Jay B. Barney (born October 8, 1954) is an American professor in strategic management at the University of Utah.

Infancy and education
Jay Barney was born in Walnut Creek, California, on October 8, 1954. He spent his formative years in San Bruno, California and graduated from San Carlos High School in San Carlos, California in 1972. He attended Brigham Young University in Provo, Utah where he majored in sociology. He graduated from BYU, summa cum laude, in December 1974 and began the Doctor of Philosophy program in sociology at Yale University in New Haven, Connecticut in 1976.

Career
Barney joined the faculty at the Anderson Graduate School of Management at UCLA in 1980. He moved to the Mays Business School at Texas A&M University in 1986, then to the Fisher College of Business at the Ohio State University in 1994, where he held the Chase Chair for Excellence in Corporate Strategy, and then to the Eccles School of Business at the University of Utah in 2012, where he held the rank of Presidential Professor and the Lassonde Chair in Social Entrepreneurship.

Professor Barney's 1991 paper has developed a framework for distinguishing among several different types of firm performance—i.e., competitive disadvantage, competitive parity, temporary competitive advantage, and sustained competitive advantage—and identified the attributes of resources and capabilities that would make them costly to imitate. This framework is known as the VRIO (Valuable, Rare, Costly to Imitate, and exploited by Organization).

In the mid-2000s, Professor Barney worked with Dr. Sharon Alvarez to develop a new theoretical approach to the study of entrepreneurship.

Research topics that build directly on resource-based theory include The Knowledge-based Theory of the Firm, Relational View, Dynamic Capabilities, theories of core competence, and competitive heterogeneity.

Barney currently serves as the editor of the Academy of Management Review.

Awards and honors
 Academy of Management Scholarly Contributions Award (2010)
 Irwin Outstanding Educator Award, Business Policy and Strategy Division of the Academy of Management (2005)
 Fellow, Academy of Management (2001)
 Fellow, Strategic Management Society (2007)
 Ph.D. (Honorary) Universidad Pontificia Comillas, Madrid, Spain (2011)
 Ph.D. (Honorary) Copenhagen Business School, Copenhagen, Denmark (2008)
 Ph.D. (Honorary) Lund University, Lund, Sweden (1997)

Selected works

Journal articles
 Jay B. Barney (1986) "Organizational Culture: Can It Be a Source of Sustained Competitive Advantage?" Academy of Management Review. 11: 656-665.
 Jay B. Barney (1986) "Strategic Factor Markets: Expectations, Luck, and Business Strategy," Management Science, 32(10): 1231-1241.
 Jay B. Barney (1988) "Returns to Bidding Firms in Mergers and Acquisitions: Reconsidering the Relatedness Hypothesis," Strategic Management Journal, 9, Special Issue: 71-78.
 Jay B. Barney (1990) The debate between Traditional Management Theory and Organizational Economics: Substantive Differences and Intergroup Conflict?, Vol. 15, No.3: 382-393
 Jay B. Barney (1991) "Firm Resources and Sustained Competitive Advantage," Journal of Management, 17(1): 99-120.
 Jay B. Barney and Mark Hansen (1994) "Trustworthiness as a Source of Competitive Advantage," Strategic Management Journal, Vol. 15: 175-190.
 Jay B. Barney (1995) "Looking Inside for Competitive Advantage," Academy of Management Executive, 9(4): 49-61.
 Bill Fuerst, Jay B. Barney, and F. Mata (1996) "Information Technology and Sustained Competitive Advantage: A Resource-Based Analysis," MIS Quarterly, 19: 487-505.
 Jay B. Barney and Patrick Wright (1998) “On Becoming a Strategic Partner: The Role of Human Resources in Gaining Competitive Advantage,” Human Resource Management, 37: 31-46.
 Sharon A. Alvarez and Jay B. Barney (2007) "Discovery and creation: alternative theories of entrepreneurial action." Strategic Entrepreneurship Journal 1(1–2): 11–26.
 Sharon A. Alvarez, Jay B. Barney, and Phillip Anderson (2012) “Forming and Exploiting Opportunities: The Implications of Discovery and Creation Processes for Entrepreneurial and Organizational Research,” Organization Science, 24(1): 301 -317.

Books
 Jay B. Barney and William G. Ouchi. (1986) Organizational Economics: Toward a New Paradigm for Studying and Understanding Organizations. San Francisco: Jossey-Bass.
 Jay B. Barney and Ricky Griffin (1992) Managing Organizations: Strategy, Structure, and Behavior. Boston: Houghton-Mifflin.  
 Jay B. Barney (2010) Gaining and Sustaining Competitive Advantage, currently in 4th edition, Upper Saddle River, NJ: Pearson/Prentice Hall. (Translated into Japanese, Chinese, Italian)
 Jay B. Barney and William Hesterly. (2014) Strategic Management and Competitive Advantage. Currently in 5th edition. Upper Saddle River, NJ: Prentice Hall. (Translated into Chinese, Korean)
 Jay B. Barney and Delwyn Clark (2007) Resource-based Theory: Creating and Sustaining Competitive Advantage. London: Oxford University Press, 2007. (Translated into Chinese)
 Jay B. Barney and Trish Clifford (2010) What I Didn’t Learn in Business School: Making Strategy Work in the Real World. Cambridge: Harvard Business Review Press. (Translated into Korean, Hungarian, Chinese, Polish)

Personal life 
Barney resides in Park City, Utah. He is married with three children.

References

 [1] Michael Porter (1979) “How competitive forces shape strategy,” Harvard Business Review, March/April: 137 – 156; Michael Porter (1980) Competitive Strategy. NY: Free Press.
 [2] Joe Bain (1956) Barriers to New Competition. Cambridge, MA: Harvard.
 [3] Richard Rumelt (1984) “Toward a strategic theory of the firm,” in R. Lamb (ed.), Competitive Strategic Management. Englewood Cliffs, NJ: Prentice Hall, pp. 556 – 570.
 [4] Birger Wernerfelt (1984) “A resource-based view of the firm,” Strategic Management Journal, 5: 171 – 180.
 [5] Jay B. Barney (1986a) “Strategic factor markets: Expectations, luck, and the theory of business strategy,” Management Science, 32(10): 1231 – 1241; Jay B. Barney (1986b) “Organizational culture: Can it be a source of sustained competitive advantage?” Academy of Management Review, 11: 656 – 665; Jay B. Barney (1988) “Returns to bidding firms in mergers and acquisitions: Reconsidering the relatedness hypothesis,” Strategic Management Journal, 9: 71 – 78.
 [6] Margie Peteraf (1993) “The cornerstones of competitive advantage: A resource-based view,” Strategic Management Journal, 14: 179 – 191.
 [7] Jay B. Barney (1991) “Firm resources and sustained competitive advantage,” Journal of Management, 17: 99 – 120.
 [8] W. B. Arthur (1989) “Competing technologies, increasing returns, and lock-in by historical events,” Economic Journal, 99: 116 – 131.
 [9] Steve Lippman and Richard Rumelt (1982) “Uncertain imitability: An analysis of inter-firm differences in efficiency under competition,” Bell Journal of Economics, 13: 418 – 438.
 [10] Jay B. Barney (1986b) “Organizational culture: Can it be a source of sustained competitive advantage?” Academy of Management Review, 11: 656 – 665.
 [11] I. Dierickx and K. Cool (1989) “Asset stock accumulation and sustainability of competitive advantage,” Management Science, 35: 1504 – 1511.
 [12] Jay B. Barney (1996) Gaining and Sustaining Competitive Advantage. Reading, MA: Addison-Wesley.
 [13] Jay B. Barney and Patrick Wright (1998) “On Becoming a Strategic Partner: The Role of Human Resources in Gaining Competitive Advantage,” Human Resource Management, 37: 31-46.
 [14] Gautum Ray, Jay Barney, and W. Muhanna (2005) “Information Technology and the Performance of the Customer Service Process in North American Insurance Companies: A Resource-based Analysis,” Management Information Systems Quarterly, 29: 625-652.
 [15] S. D. Hunt and D.F. Davis (2008) “Grounding supply chain management in resource-advantage theory,” Journal of Supply Chain Management, 44(1): 10 – 21.
 [16] Sharon Alvarez and Jay B. Barney (2007) “Discovery and Creation: Alternative Theories of Entrepreneurial Action,” Strategic Entrepreneurship Journal 1(1): pp. 11 – 26; Sharon Alvarez, Jay B. Barney, and Phil Anderson (2013) “Forming and Exploiting Opportunities: The Implications of Discovery and Creation Processes for Entrepreneurial and Organizational Research,” Organization Science, 24(1): 301 -317.

See also

Core competency
Marketing strategy 
Resource-based view

1954 births
Living people
American business theorists